Vicente Poggi Sassi (born 11 July 2002) is a Uruguayan professional footballer who plays as a midfielder for Liga MX club Necaxa.

Club career
A youth academy graduate of Defensor Sporting, Poggi made his professional debut on 20 September 2020 in a 4–2 league win against Deportivo Maldonado. He scored his first goal on 18 January 2021 in a 1–1 draw against Montevideo Wanderers.

Following Defensor's relegation from top division after 2020 season, Poggi joined Liga MX club Necaxa. On 7 May 2021, Defensor officially announced Poggi's departure from the club.

International career
Poggi is a current player for the Uruguayan U-20 national football team. He has represented his nation at 2017 South American U-15 Championship and 2019 South American U-17 Championship.

Career statistics

Club

References

External links
 

2002 births
Living people
Footballers from Montevideo
Association football midfielders
Uruguayan footballers
Uruguay youth international footballers
Uruguayan Primera División players
Liga MX players
Liga de Expansión MX players
Defensor Sporting players
Club Necaxa footballers
Atlético Morelia players
Uruguayan expatriate footballers
Uruguayan expatriate sportspeople in Mexico
Expatriate footballers in Mexico